Latinica may refer to:

 Latinica (talk show), a 1993–2011 Croatian political television talk show broadcast on HRT 1
 Gaj's Latin alphabet